Ortensia Poncarale Maggi (1732–1811) was an Italian painter. Her maiden name is sometimes given as Poncarli or Poncarali.

Maggi was born in Brescia, the daughter of Ercole Poncarli (or Poncarale) and Chiara Rodengo. In 1762 she married count Annibale Camillo Maggi-Via. She lived in Parma for many years. Maggi studied painting with Francesco Monti, and worked in oil and pastels. The reception piece which she produced for the former, a pastel of a farm girl with a basket of fruit, is kept in the Galleria nazionale di Parma, and is today her only surviving work.

References

1732 births
1811 deaths
Italian women painters
18th-century Italian painters
18th-century Italian women artists
19th-century Italian painters
19th-century Italian women artists
Painters from Brescia
Painters from Parma
Pastel artists